Roundup Creek is a stream in the U.S. state of South Dakota.

Roundup Creek was frequently the origin point of a roundup of cattle, hence the name.

See also
List of rivers of South Dakota

References

Rivers of Jones County, South Dakota
Rivers of Mellette County, South Dakota
Rivers of South Dakota